Al-Aziziyah is an Iraqi town located in Wasit Province, on the left bank of the Tigris River. Located approximately 80 kilometers northwest of Kut, it is the administrative and political centre of Al-Aziziyah District. As of 2009, it had an estimated population of 44,868 citizens.

History
It was established in 1866 by Ottoman Midhat Pasha, in honor of Sultan Abdülaziz. On 6 October 1915, English soldiers Percy Cox and Gerard Leachman met at Al-Aziziyah to discuss how to free Baghdad from the Ottomans.

References

Populated places in Wasit Governorate
Cities in Iraq